Kerui Petroleum is a Chinese oil services and equipment company. It provides equipment and EPC services for oil drilling and production and natural gas plants.

The Middle East headquarters is in Abu Dhabi and bases in Dammam, Saudi Arabia and Izmir, Turkey. Major markets for the company are Egypt, Algeria, Libya, Gabon, Nigeria, Oman, UAE, and Iraq.

Projects
 - Awarded contract by Petrobras as a consortium of Kerui Petroleum Equipment Co. Ltd. and Brazilian consortium partner Metodo Potencial Engenharia SA, to build a natural gas processing unit in Itaborai.
 - Awarded contract by PDVSA to upgrade 624 wells in the Lake Maracaibo region.

References

Manufacturing companies of China
Companies based in Shandong